Lotte Tarp (14 February 1945 – 24 October 2002) was a Danish film actress. She appeared in 27 films between 1962 and 1990. She was born in Århus to the Danish composer, Svend Erik Tarp and died in Copenhagen.

Partial filmography

 Crazy Paradise (1962) - Karen
 Den kære familie (1962)
 Weekend (1962) - Barnepigen Birthe
 Premiere i helvede (1964) - Tove Møller
 Fem mand og Rosa (1964) - Model
 Don Olsen kommer til byen (1964) - Tambourmajor
 Ih, du forbarmende (1965) - Miss 44
 Morianna (1965) - Rita
 En krone på højkant (1966)
 The Reluctant Sadist (1967) - Baroness
 The Jokers (1967) - Inge
 People Meet and Sweet Music Fills the Heart (1967) - Kose
 The Olsen Gang (1968) - Ulla
 De røde heste (1968) - Henriette
 Fun and Games for Everyone (1968)
 Eftermiddagsgæsten (1968)
 The Man Who Thought Life (1969) - Susanne
 Me and My Kid Brother and Doggie (1969) - Fru Bossholm
 Giv Gud en chance om søndagen (1970) - Hanne Riesing
 Farlige kys (1972) - Birthe Kold
 Hjerter er trumf (1976) - Lone Bang
 Girls at Arms 2 (1976) - Journalisten Kirsten
 Kvindesind (1980) - Lene
 Bakom jalusin (1984) - Ellen Joergensen
 A Handful of Time (1989) - Ada
 Piger er en plage! (1990) - Lise Søndergård

External links

1945 births
2002 deaths
Danish film actresses
Best Actress Bodil Award winners
People from Aarhus
Burials at Holmen Cemetery